The soundtrack to the 2005 motion picture Serenity was released on September 27, 2005. The film's score was composed by David Newman, and performed by the Hollywood Studio Symphony under Newman's direction. According to director Joss Whedon's sleeve notes for the album, Newman was recommended by Universal's music executives when he requested a musician capable of "everything." It is of note that the acoustic guitar version of the Ballad of Serenity, which was used at the end of the film's credits, is absent from the soundtrack.

Track listing

References

Reviews
 David Newman - Serenity Original Motion Picture Soundtrack, by Spence D. at IGN.com
 Music in the 'Verse: Firefly and Serenity by Steve Townsley at tracksounds.com

Film scores
Firefly (franchise)
2005 soundtrack albums
Science fiction soundtracks